Azita Ghanizada is an actress of Afghan descent, based in the United States, who has appeared in various films and television series. One of her earliest roles was in the short film,  A kiss on the nose, where she portrayed the character of Ciara. In addition to her acting work, Ghanizada is also the founder and President of the MENA Arts Advocacy Coalition.

Life and career
Azita Ghanizada is a Television, Film and Stage Actress.

Ghanizada's life in America began as a political asylum seeker. Her father's relationships from working at the U.S. Embassy in Tehran, Iran afforded her family the opportunity to flee Afghanistan when she was a baby.  She learned most of her English from watching American Television in the Virginia suburbs of Washington D.C; her fascination to learn from American T.V., combined with the family's regular trips to a local cinema that showed Bollywood movies, and her mother's passionate love of Indian and American film stars, inspired her to become an actress. She relocated to Los Angeles, California and began her on-camera career by working in television commercials and guest starring on popular television shows. A few of her notable television guest-starring roles include How I Met Your Mother, Entourage, Veronica Mars, The Mentalist , Psych, Ghost Whisperer, Castle, and Up All Night. In 2016, she was named "One of The 7 Sundance Break-out Actresses You Need to Know," for her work in "Complete Unknown."

Her first main role on television was in 2008, when Ghanizada joined the cast of the General Hospital prime-time spin-off General Hospital: Night Shift for season 2 as Dr. Saira Batra, a specialist in holistic medicine.  The following year she joined the all-star cast of the television pilot Tough Trade starring opposite Sam Shepard and Cary Elwes, from Weeds creator Jenji Kohan, and executive producer T Bone Burnett.  In 2010, she joined David Strathairn as a primary cast member of the American Syfy Channel series Alphas where she played Rachel Pirzad, a woman with enhanced sensory abilities. Alphas was picked up to series in 2011 but only lasted two seasons.  She went on to film the comedy pilot Ellen More or Less in 2014 as a primary cast member for NBC directed by Peyton Reed, the television pilot was not picked up to series. In 2016, Azita appeared in the feature Complete Unknown opposite Rachel Weisz and Michael Shannon, in 2017 she began production on Kevin Smith's feature film KillRoy Was Here. In 2019, she began recurring roles on both Ballers and Good Trouble.

In 2022 she made her Broadway Debut in the stage adaptation of The Kite Runner on Broadway, cast as Soraya (original).

Ghanizada is also a notable DEI advocate for MENA/SWANA performers in Hollywood, and activist for women in Afghanistan. In 2016, she founded the MENA Arts Advocacy Coalition, MAAC, and began to advocate on behalf of Middle Eastern North African, "MENA" or aka South West Asian North African "SWANA" performers. In 2017, after two years of lobbying SAG-AFTRA with other performers to include Middle Eastern North African (MENA), as its own diverse category in the producers theatrical contracts, she succeeded.  Marking the first new hiring category in a labor contract in 37 years. She also works as a global Ambassador for "Women for Women International", focusing on getting women in Afghanistan back to work and educated.

Filmography

References

External links

Living people
Afghan television actresses
Afghan film actresses
Afghan emigrants to the United States
American television personalities
American television actresses
American film actresses
Virginia Tech alumni
21st-century American actresses
Year of birth missing (living people)